In Ancient Greece, dokimasia (Greek: δοκιμασία) was the name used at Athens to denote the process of ascertaining the capacity of the citizens for the exercise of public rights and duties.

If, for instance, a young citizen was to be admitted among the epheboi, he was examined in an assembly of his district to find out whether he was descended on both sides from Athenian citizens, and whether he possessed the physical capacity for military service. All officials, too—even the members of the Boule, the Council of 500—had to submit to an examination before entering upon their office. The purpose of this was to ascertain not their actual capacity for the post, which was presupposed in all candidates, but their descent from Athenian citizens, their life and character, and (in the case of some offices which involved the administration of large sums) even the amount of their property.

The examination was carried on in public by the archons in the presence of the Boule, and anyone present had the right to raise objections. If such objections were held to be valid, the candidate was rejected; but he had the right to appeal the decision to a court, which would take cognizance of the matter in judicial form. On the other hand, if he were accepted, anyone who thought his claims insufficient had the right of instituting judicial proceedings against him. If the decision was adverse, he would lose his office and be further liable to punishment depending on the offence—which could be, for instance, that of unlawfully assuming the rights of a citizen.

A speaker in a public assembly might thus be brought before a court by any citizen, for only one possessing the full right of citizenship could legally address the people. The question might thus be raised whether the orator were not actually atimos, or guilty of an offence which involved atimia.

Docimasia may also refer to the lung float test.

References
This article incorporates content from the 1894 Dictionary of Classical Antiquities, which is in the public domain.

Society of ancient Greece
Athenian democracy
Rites of passage
Ancient Greek law